Glipostenoda excisa is a species of beetle in the genus Glipostenoda. It was described in 1967.

References

excisa
Beetles described in 1967